"Policeman" is a single by Dutch singer Eva Simons, featuring Jamaican dancehall artist Konshens. The song was released on 10 April 2015, followed by a music video. The song was produced by Sidney Samson, who worked with her on her previous single, "Celebrate the Rain". On 6 November 2015 a remix with Faydee was released.

The song is included in the 2019 dance rhythm video game Just Dance 2020.

Track listing

Charts

Weekly charts

Year-end charts

Certifications

References

Songs about police officers
2015 singles
Eva Simons songs
2015 songs
Moombahton songs
Songs written by Eva Simons
Number-one singles in Israel